Feldheim may refer to:

Places
Feldheim, part of Treuenbrietzen, Brandenburg, Germany

People
Ervin Feldheim (1912–1944), Hungarian mathematician

Organizations
Feldheim Publishers, established in 1939 in New York City

See also
Feldheim Collection, philatelic collection of the British Library